Pilot Mound can refer to:

 Pilot Mound, Manitoba, Canada
 Pilot Mound, Iowa, United States
 Pilot Mound Township, Minnesota, United States